Alexander Young may refer to:

Alexander Young (bishop) (died 1684), 17th century Scottish prelate
Alexander Young (engineer) (1833–1910), Scottish engineer and businessman who became a citizen of the Kingdom of Hawaii
Alexander Young (musician) (1938–1997), Scottish guitarist and session musician
Alexander Young (New Zealand politician) (1875–1956), New Zealand politician
Alexander Young (tenor) (1920–2000), English tenor
Alexander Young (VC) (1873–1916), Victoria Cross recipient
Alexander MacGillivray Young (1878–1939), Canadian politician
Alexander Bell Filson Young (1876–1938), better known as Filson Young, an Irish journalist
Alex Young (footballer, born 1880) (1880–1959), Scottish professional footballer
Alex Young (footballer, born 1937) (1937–2017), Scottish professional footballer

See also
Alex Young (disambiguation)
Alexander Young Building, a former building in Honolulu, demolished in 1981